James Williams (August 4, 1825 – April 12, 1899) was an American farmer and politician from Smyrna, in Kent County, Delaware. He was a member of the Democratic Party, who served in the Delaware General Assembly and as U. S. Representative from Delaware.

Early life and family
Williams was the son of John (1775-1849) and Esther Williams in Philadelphia, Pennsylvania. His father was a lumber merchant, and his early education was by private tutoring. He first became an apprentice carpenter, intending to become an architect. In 1848 his father bought a large estate in Kent County, Delaware and young Williams moved to Kenton to take up farming and manage the property.

Professional and political career
Williams became politically active in the Democratic Party, and was elected to the Delaware House of Representatives, serving in 1857/1858, 1863/1864 and 1883/84. He next served in the State Senate from 1891/92, and was the Speaker of the Senate for 1869/70. In 1872 he was a delegate to the party's national convention which nominated Horace Greeley for U.S. President. Williams was twice elected as Delaware's only member in the United States House of Representatives, serving in two terms from 1875 until 1879, in the 44th and 45th Congress under U.S. Presidents Ulysses S. Grant and Rutherford B. Hayes.

He remained a farmer throughout his public service. After returning to private life he expanded into fertilizer manufacturing, and increased his farm holdings in Delaware and Maryland. In 1891 he moved to Smyrna, Delaware, but continued farming for the rest of his life.

Death and legacy
Williams lived quietly, died at Smyrna, and is buried there at the St. Peter's Episcopal Church Cemetery.

Almanac
Elections are held the first Tuesday after November 1. Members of the General Assembly take office the second Tuesday of January. State Senators have a four-year term and State Representatives have a two-year term. Williams completed part of an existing State Senate term. U.S. Representatives took office March 4 and have a two-year term.

References

External links
Biographical Directory of the United States Congress
Delaware's Members of Congress
Find a Grave
The Political Graveyard

Places with more information
Delaware Historical Society; website; 505 North Market Street, Wilmington, Delaware 19801; (302) 655-7161
University of Delaware; Library website; 181 South College Avenue, Newark, Delaware 19717; (302) 831-2965

1825 births
1899 deaths
People from Smyrna, Delaware
Democratic Party Delaware state senators
Democratic Party members of the Delaware House of Representatives
Burials in Kent County, Delaware
Democratic Party members of the United States House of Representatives from Delaware
19th-century American politicians